Podgornoye (also Podgornoe) is a village in the Alamüdün District in Chüy Region of Kyrgyzstan. Its population was 638 in 2021.

References

Populated places in Chüy Region